The 1941 Lafayette Leopards football team was an American football team represented the Lafayette College as a member of the Middle Three Conference during the 1941 college football season.  In its fifth season under head coach Edward Mylin, the team compiled a 5–4 record and won the Middle Three championship. The team played its home games at Fisher Field in Easton, Pennsylvania. Joseph Laird and John McKenna were the team captains.

Schedule

References

Lafayette
Lafayette Leopards football seasons
Lafayette football